MEXX–Watersley International Women's Cycling Team is a cycling team based in the Netherlands, founded in 2016, which attained UCI status for the 2019 season.
The team announced on their facebook page the intention to fold the team at the end of the 2019 season, however their support staff and a few riders would be moving to Andy Schleck Cycles - Immo Losch.

Team roster
As at 28 October 2019

Major Wins

2016
 Internationales Rück XXXL, Erin Kinnealy
 Sparkassen Giro, Kirsten Peetoom
 Klimoploop van Ulestraten, Kirsten Peetoom
 Rund um Merken, Kylie Waterreus

2017
 Innerschweizermeisterschaften, Désirée Ehrler
 Rund um Merken, Désirée Ehrler
 Aargauer Challenge Rüfenach, Désirée Ehrler
 Zandhoven (Pulderbos), Femke Geeris
 Ronde van Goor, Kirsten Peetoom
 Mettmanner Sparkassen-Cup, Tamara Preuss
 District Championship Limburg (Time Trial), Christel Van Loo
 Rund um Düren, Kylie Waterreus

2018
 Gerwen Criterium, Roos Hoogeboom
 Rotterdam, Roos Hoogeboom
 Gilze-Rijen, Roos Hoogeboom
 Mill, Roos Hoogeboom

2019
  Youth classification Festival Elsy Jacobs, Franziska Koch

National Champions
2017
 New Zealand U23 Road Race, Amanda Jamieson
 Austrian Track (500m time trial), Verena Eberhardt
 Austrian Track (Individual sprint), Verena Eberhardt
 Austrian Track (Points race), Verena Eberhardt
 Austrian Track (Omnium), Verena Eberhardt
 Austrian Track (Scratch race), Verena Eberhardt

2018
 Singapore Road Race, Jer Ling Serene Lee
 Austrian Track (Omnium), Verena Eberhardt
 Austrian Track (Points race), Verena Eberhardt
 Austrian Track (Scratch race), Verena Eberhardt

2019
 Greek Road Race, Argiro Milaki
 Greek Track (Keirin), Argiro Milaki
 Greek Track (Scratch race), Argiro Milaki

References

Cycling teams established in 2016
2016 establishments in the Netherlands
Cycling teams based in the Netherlands